Vahid Nemati (born May 28, 1988)  is an Iranian footballer who plays for Aluminium Arak in the Persian Gulf Pro League.

Club career

 Assist Goals

References

1988 births
Living people
Saba players
Shamoushak Noshahr players
Fajr Sepasi players
Iranian footballers
Association football midfielders